Gary Fitzpatrick (born 31 March 1955) is a former Australian rules footballer who played with Essendon in the Victorian Football League (VFL). Recruited from Moonee Ponds in the Essendon District Football League, Fitzpatrick left Essendon in 1976 to play with Brunswick in the Victorian Football Association (VFA). After a single season there, he moved to Queensland and played with Mayne and Banyo, the latter of which he captain-coached.

Notes

External links 
		

Essendon Football Club past player profile

Living people
1955 births
Australian rules footballers from Victoria (Australia)
Essendon Football Club players
Essendon District Football League players
Brunswick Football Club players
Mayne Australian Football Club players